The French Vegetarian Society (also known as Vegetarian Society of France) was a vegetarian organization, formed in 1882 by G. Goyart. The aim of the Society was to "propagate vegetarianism and assert the benefits of any order it presents."

History

The Society had its own journal, . In 1899, President Jules Grand reconstituted the Society with thirty initial members. Membership consisted of doctors, industrial workers, lawyers and soldiers. Their members were dedicated vegetarians but they also allowed associate members to join.

In 1906, the Society had 800 members and collaborated with the Belgian Vegetarian Society on their journal, . Ernest Nyssens, from Brussels, was editor of the journal. Historian Ulrike Thoms has noted that "its membership actively sought to influence the population through the dissemination of magazines, tracts, pamphlets, and public lectures, so the society was more publicly present than the small official membership lists suggest."

During the early 20th century, physicians such as Fougerat de David de Lastours, Eugène Tardif, André Durville, Gaston Durville, and Albert Monteuuis were members of the Society. In 1909, the Society reported having 1,175 members. The Society published  every month until it ceased in 1914.

After the decline of the Society, new food reform groups emerged.

Selected publications

The Society published the following books:

Ernest Nyssens,  (1900)
Jules Grand,  (1901)
Louis Pascault,  (1902)
Carlotto Schulz,  (1903)
Jules Lefèvre, Examen scientifique du végétarisme (1904)
Henri Colliere, Végétarisme et longévité (1905)

See also

List of vegetarian organizations
Vegetarian Society

References

External links
History of the French Vegetarian Societies - International Vegetarian Union

Organizations based in Paris
Organizations established in 1882
Vegetarian organizations